Chen Jinjang (Chinese: 陈金刚; born February 4, 1958) is a Chinese coach and a former international football player. As a player, he was predominantly remembered for his time at Tianjin City while internationally he played for China in the 1980 Asian Cup. After retiring, he moved into management, where he moved back to Tianjin with Tianjin Teda F.C. before having a short spell as the Chinese U-20 coach and then Changchun Yatai.

Playing career 
Chen Jingang played for the Tianjin City youth, where he went on to graduate into the senior team by the 1977 league season. At Tianjin he went on to establish himself as a vital player within the team and soon aid the team to the 1980 league title. This then saw him called up to the Chinese national team and was  included in the squad that took part in the 1980 Asian Cup. After a disappointing tournament the manager Su Yongshun kept faith with Chen and included him in the squad that took part 1982 Fifa World Cup qualifiers where China missed out on qualifying after losing 2-1 to New Zealand in the final play-off round.

Career statistics

International statistics

Honours

Player
Tianjin City
Chinese Jia-A League: 1980

References

External links
Player profile at sodasoccer
Team China Stats

1958 births
Living people
Chinese footballers
Footballers from Tianjin
China international footballers
Chinese football managers
Tianjin Jinmen Tiger F.C. players
Changchun Yatai F.C. managers
1980 AFC Asian Cup players
Association football forwards